Joseph Leopold Eybler's Clarinet Concerto in B-flat major was written in 1798, probably for Mozart's clarinetist Anton Stadler. It is catalogued by Herrmann as HV 160.

For clarinet and orchestra in three movements:

 Allegro maestoso
 Adagio
 Rondo alla turca: Allegro

Discography

Along with clarinet concertos by Franz Xaver Süssmayr and Mozart (Clarinet Concerto), it was recorded on the Novalis label by Dieter Klöcker and the English Chamber Orchestra in 1994. It was also recorded in 2000 on the Cavalli Records label by Peter Rabl and Concilium Musicum Wien (on period instruments) conducted by Paul Angerer, along with a serenade of Michael Haydn and a symphony of Ignaz Pleyel.

References

Compositions by Joseph Leopold Eybler
1798 compositions
Eybler
Compositions in B-flat major